Pattaya Kelappu is a 2008 Tamil language action comedy film written, produced and directed by Ponnambalam, making his directorial debut. It stars Sriman, Payal and Ponnambalam, with Janagaraj, Dhamu, Pandu, Vasu Vikram, Kazan Khan and Crane Manohar playing supporting roles. The film began production in 2004 and was released in 2008.

Plot

Ananthakrishnan (Sriman) is a jobless young graduate who is looking for a job in the city. Ananthakrishnan comes across three good-for-nothings Saamy (Dhamu), Nalan (Vasu Vikram) and Mano (Crane Manohar)). Having sympathy for him, the three friends decide to help him. Ananthakrishnan then moves in with them, the house is owned by the old man Arunachalam (Janagaraj) and he accommodated them for free. Meanwhile, Dhanam (Payal) after finishing her studies in the city returns to her native place. When she arrives at her village, her servant told her that her uncle (Kazan Khan) killed her father (Vijay Krishnaraj) and he is willing to marry her for stealing her property. A shocked Dhanam then goes back to the city and her friend Deepa (Minnal Deepa) hosts her.

One day, Arunachalam receives a demand draft of five lakhs of rupees on behalf of Anandakrishnan and Ananthakrishnan then withdraws money from the bank. Thereafter, a rowdy named Anandakrishnan (Ponnambalam) stated that the demand draft belonged to him and asks for the money but they confess that they have spent it all. In anger, Anandakrishnan threatens to kill them if they don't kill a man without any sort of trace. Ananthakrishnan and his friends don't know what to do and luckily, the man is found dead a few days later. Anandakrishnan congratulates them for the job done and offers them another mission: to catch Dhanam and to bring her to him. Anandakrishnan will then bring her to her uncle. Dhanam is none other than Ananthakrishnan's lover.

Saamy, Nalan and Mano then kidnap the innocent Dhanam with ease. When Anandakrishnan's henchmen carry Dhanam in their van, Ananthakrishnan, with a Kerchief covering his face, stops their van and beats them up thus saving his lover Dhanam. Ananthakrishnan and Dhanam decide to get married in a hurry but Anandakrishnan intercepts them and Dhanam is forced to give her property. Later, Dhanam's uncle tries to stop the marriage but surprisingly, Anandakrishnan becomes a good person and decided to support the young lovers. During their fight, the police arrive on the scene and shoot dead Dhanam's uncle. Anandakrishnan then gives back the property to Dhanam and surrenders to the police. The film ends with Ananthakrishnan and Payal getting married.

Cast

Sriman as Ananthakrishnan
Payal as Dhanam
Ponnambalam as Anandakrishnan
Janagaraj as Arunachalam
Dhamu as Saamy
Pandu as Thangam
Vasu Vikram as Nalan
Kazan Khan as Dhanam's uncle
Crane Manohar as Mano
Halwa Vasu as Arumugam
Besant Ravi as Police Inspector
Karate Raja
Ganeshkar
Vijay Krishnaraj as Dhanam's father
Scissor Manohar as Postman
Saravana Sakthi as Waiter
Minnal Deepa as Deepa
Sushmitha as Sarasu
S. Lalitha as Mami
Priyanka as Bhagya
Sethu Vinayagam
Ravi Shanth
Prem Pandi
Paya Raja
Sampath Ram
Daniel
Ghilli Chandrasekhar

Production
In 2004, Ponnambalam who had primarily appeared in supporting roles began working in Pattaya Kelappu produced by his home production Annai Vannamathi Films and said that his debut is targeted at the mass audiences in the urban and rural milieu. Sriman who acted as the hero in the Telugu action film Dharma (2004), signed to play the hero and hoped that the film will break the jinx. Payal was chosen to play the female lead role while the director Ponnambalam will play a side role.

Soundtrack

The film score and the soundtrack were composed by E. L. Indhrajith. The soundtrack, released in 2004, features 5 tracks with lyrics written by Muthu Vijayan.

References

2008 films
2000s Tamil-language films
Indian action comedy films
2008 directorial debut films
2008 action comedy films